Rathimanmadhan is a 1977 Indian Malayalam-language film, directed by J. Sasikumar and produced by M. A. Rahman and Naseema Kabeer. The film stars Prem Nazir, Jayabharathi, Jayan and Sukumari. The film has musical score by M. S. Viswanathan.
This title was remake of Kumari Penn either Man ki meet

Cast

Prem Nazir as Maran / Sreekumar
Jayabharathi as Shalini
Jayan as Sekharan
Sukumari as Gomathi
Adoor Bhasi as Dassapan
Thikkurissy Sukumaran Nair as Thampi 
Sankaradi as Kuruppu
Sreelatha Namboothiri
T. R. Omana
Cochin Haneefa
Paul Vengola
Bahadoor as Dr Keshava Pilla
KPAC Sunny
Kunchan
Meena
T. P. Madhavan

Soundtrack
The music was composed by M. S. Viswanathan and the lyrics were written by Pappanamkodu Lakshmanan.

References

External links
 

1977 films
1970s Malayalam-language films
Films scored by M. S. Viswanathan
Malayalam remakes of Tamil films